Andhra was a kingdom mentioned in the epics Ramayana & Mahabharata. It was a southern kingdom, currently identified as Indian state of Andhra Pradesh which got its name from.

Andhra communities are also mentioned in the Vayu and Matsya Purana. In the Mahabharata the infantry of Satyaki was composed of a tribe called Andhras, known for their long hair, tall stature, sweet language, and mighty prowess. They lived along the banks of the Godavari river. Andhras and Kalingas supported the Kauravas during the Mahabharata war. Sahadeva defeated the kingdoms of Pandya, Andhra, Kalinga, Dravida, Odra and Chera while performing the Rajasuya yajna. Buddhist references to Andhras are also found.

 

Andhra was mentioned in Sanskrit epics such as the Aitareya Brahmana (by some estimates c. 800 BCE). According to Aitareya Brahmana of the Rigveda, the Andhras left North India from the banks of river Yamuna and migrated to South India. They are mentioned at the time of the death of the great Mauryan King Ashoka in 232 BC. This date has been considered to be the beginning of the Andhra historical record. Various dynasties have ruled the area, including the Andhra (or Satavahana), Andhra Ikshvakus, Eastern Chalukyas, the Kakatiyas, the Vijayanagara Empire.

History

Origin
 
The entire region of Andhra contains a profusion of curious historical artifacts, rock art, stone age tools that describe the growth patterns in the region. The earliest references to Andhra come from the Jataka tales and the Pallava inscriptions as Andhapatham and Andhakas, referring to the region and its people respectively. 

The earliest description of the people belonging to the present Andhra region though comes from the Buddhist sculptures at Amaravati in Andhra Pradesh. The locals here are depicted as having the heads of snakes. This is, as is common in those times, a symbolic representation. Also, the region is also referred to as Nagadesa and its kings as Nagas.

The word Andhra is first observed from Udyotana's description of 'those with beautiful bodies, who love women and war alike and are great consumers of food' in 779 CE. The reference to Aitareya Brahmana is generally not taken as a basis as it evolved and grew for over 2500 years with many additions throughout the time, till it is canonized in the medieval times. 

Andhra people in the present day are identified as Telugu People belonging to the coastal regions of erstwhile Kalinga (Srikakulam, Visakhapatnam and East Godavari Districts/above Godavari River of present state of Andhra Pradesh, India) and Trilinga Desa (parts of Andhra Pradesh and Telangana). The predominant language is Telugu with few minority languages are Koya, Savara, Lambadi, Gadaba, Gondu and Urdu.

Andhra dynasties

 Satavahana dynasty, 
 Andhra Ikshvaku 
 Salankayanas 
 Vishnukundina Dynasty

References in Mahabharata

Andhra mentioned as an ancient times
Mbh 6.9

....the Angas, the Vangas, the Kalingas, the Yakrillomans; the Mallas, the Suddellas, the Pranradas, the Mahikas, the Sasikas; the Valhikas, the Vatadhanas, the Abhiras or Ahirs, the Kalajoshakas; the Aparantas, the Parantas, the Pahnabhas, the Charmamandalas; the Atavisikharas, the Mahabhutas, O sire; the Upavrittas, the Anupavrittas, the Surashatras, Kekayas; the Kutas, the Maheyas, the Kakshas, the Samudranishkutas; the Andhras........

Pandava Sahadeva's conquests
Mbh 2.30

Sahadeva brought under his subjection and exacted tributes from the Paundrayas, Andhras, Kalingas, Dravidas, Udrakeralas, Ushtrakarnikas, and also the delightful city of Atavi and that of the Yavanas.

Karna's conquests
Mbh 7.4

The Utpalas, the Mekalas, the Paundras, the Kalingas, the Andhras, the Nishadas, the Trigartas, and the Valhikas, were all vanquished by Karna.

Vasudeva Krishna, the slayer of Chanura of Andhra Kingdom

Vasudeva Krishna is mentioned as the slayer of Chanura of the Andhra country. (13,149)

Arjuna's conquests after the Kurukshetra War

In southern regions, battle took place between Arjuna and the Dravidas and Andhras and the fierce Mahishakas and the hillmen of Kolwa. Subjugating those tribes without having to accomplish any fierce feats, Arjuna proceeded to the country of the Surashtras, his footsteps guided by the horse. (14,83)

Andhras present in Yudhishthira's Rajasuya sacrifice
Mbh 2.33

King Bhagadatta of Pragjyotisha accompanied by all Mlechcha tribes inhabiting the marshy regions on the sea-shore; and many mountain kings, and king Vrihadvala; and Vasudeva the king of the Paundrayas, and the kings of Vanga and Kalinga; and Akastha and Kuntala and the kings of the Malavas and the Andhrakas; and the Dravidas and the Singhalas and the king of Kashmira, and king Kuntibhoja of great energy and king Gauravahana, and all the other heroic kings of Valhika; and Virata with his two sons, and Mavella endued with great might; and various kings and princes ruling in various countries attended Pandava king Yudhishthira's Rajasuya sacrifice.

Andhras as the allies of the Pandavas
Mbh 5.140

The Dravidas, with the Kuntalas, the Andhras, and the Talacharas, and the Shuchupas, and the Venupas were mentioned as allies of the Pandavas, in the conversation of Vasudeva Krishna and Karna.

Andhras as the allies of Kauravas
Mbh 5.161, 5.162

The message sent by Duryodhana to the Pandava:-

The Kamvojas, the Sakas, the Khasas, the Salwas, the Matsyas, the Kurus of the middle country, the Mlechchhas, the Pulindas, the Dravidas, the Andhras, and the Kanchis --- these tribes protect my army.

Andhras in Kurukshetra War

On the side of the Pandavas
Mbh 8.12

Decked with ornaments, possessed of red teeth, endued with the prowess of infuriate elephants, attired in robes of diverse colours, smeared with powdered scents, armed with swords and nooses, capable of restraining mighty elephants, companions in death, and never deserting one another, equipped with quivers, bearing bows adorned with long locks, and agreeable in speech were the combatants of the infantry files led by Satyaki, belonging to the Talavana tribe, endued with fierce forms and great energy. (The Pandyas, Cholas, Keralas and Dravidas followed Dhrishtadyumna, Sikhandin, Chekitana and the sons of Draupadi.)
It appears that the Andhakas fought along with Satyaki are Yadavas.  Yadavas are of 5 different races i.e. Yadu, Vrushni, Mushti, Bhoja and Andhakas. However, Andhras are different.  According to Bhagavatha purana, Andhras are the decedents of King Bali means.  Andhras are six such Anga, Vanga, Kalings, Simha, Pundra and Andhras.  So Andhras are different from Andhakas.  Andhras are eastern where as Andhakas are western yadavas. The clarification is sufficient to distinguish Andhakas from Andhras.  The Chanura is also one of Andhakas and not of Andhras.

On the side of the Kauravas
Mbh 8.73

Of terrible deeds and exceedingly fierce, the Tusharas, the Yavanas, the Khasas, the Darvabhisaras, the Daradas, the Sakas, the Kamathas, the Ramathas, the Tanganas, the Andhrakas, the Pulindas, the Kiratas of fierce prowess, the Mlecchas, the Mountaineers, and the races hailing from the sea-side, all endued with great wrath and great might, delighting in battle and armed with maces, these all—united with the Kurus and fighting wrathfully for Duryodhana’s sake.

See also
 Kingdoms of Ancient India

References

External links
 Andhras- The world's oldest tribe

Mahabharata of Krishna Dwaipayana Vyasa, translated to English by Kisari Mohan Ganguli

Kingdoms in the Mahabharata
History of Andhra Pradesh